Glauco Servadei (27 July 1913 – 27 December 1968) was an Italian professional road bicycle racer. Servadei won 6 stages in the Giro d'Italia and two in the Tour de France. He also competed in the individual and team road race events at the 1936 Summer Olympics.

Major results

1931
Giro dell'Emilia
1937
Giro d'Italia:
Winner stages 15 and 18
1938
Tour de France:
Winner stages 6B and 20
1939
Giro d'Italia:
Winner stage 9A
1940
Giro d'Italia:
Winner stages 6, 14 and 18
1942
Coppa Bernocchi
Milano - Mantova
1943
Giro della provincia Milano

References

External links

Official Tour de France results for Glauco Servadei

1913 births
1968 deaths
Italian male cyclists
Italian Tour de France stage winners
People from Forlì
Cyclists from Emilia-Romagna
Olympic cyclists of Italy
Cyclists at the 1936 Summer Olympics
Sportspeople from the Province of Forlì-Cesena